Events from the year 1965 in art.

Events
 March 19 – A record price of 760,000 guineas is paid at Christie's London auction house for Rembrandt's painting Titus.
 May – Avant-garde artists Marta Minujín and Rubén Santantonín present La Menesunda in Buenos Aires, one of the first installations in art history.
 September – Indica Gallery counterculture bookshop and art gallery opens in London.
 October 7 – Release in the United States of the biographical film The Agony and the Ecstasy with Charlton Heston portraying Michelangelo.
 December – Max's Kansas City nightclub opens in New York City; it quickly became a hangout of choice for artists and sculptors of the New York School and other members of the avant-garde.

Awards
 Archibald Prize: Clifton Pugh – R A Henderson
 John Moores Painting Prize – Michael Tyzack for " Alesso 'B' "
 British sculptor Barbara Hepworth is created a Dame.

Works

 Yaacov Agam – Double Metamorphosis II
 Joseph Beuys – How to Explain Pictures to a Dead Hare (performance piece)
 Mark di Suvero – Bunyon's Chess (sculpture, Seattle)
 Lucian Freud – Reflection with Two Children (self-portrait)
 L. S. Lowry
 Huddersfield
 Industrial Scene
 Miguel Miramontes – Equestrian statue of José María Morelos
 Roman Opałka – 1965 /1 – ∞
 John Petts – Birmingham, Alabama, 16th Street Baptist Church, West Window
 Fairfield Porter  – Elizabeth
 James Rosenquist  – F-111
 Andy Warhol  – Empire (film, released)
 Carel Willink – To the Future
 David Wynne – Busts of Joan Baez and Oskar Kokoschka
 John Fitzgerald Kennedy Memorial (Portland, Oregon)

Births
 January 21 – Robert Del Naja, English graffiti artist and trip hop musician
 February 20 – Miriam Mone, Northern Irish fashion designer (died 2007)
 March 9 – Brom, American illustrator
 July 9 – Jason Rhoades, American installation artist (died 2006)
 December 16 – Ellen Gallagher, American artist
 date unknown
 Hurvin Anderson, English painter
 Tacita Dean, English-born visual artist
 Andrea Fraser, American performance artist
 Elizabeth Peyton, American portrait painter
 Jessica Voorsanger, American-born visual artist
 Alison Watt, Scottish painter 
 Andrea Zittel, American installation artist and sculptor

Deaths
 January 3 – Milton Avery, American painter (born 1885)
 January 7 – Anne Redpath, Scottish still life painter (born 1895)
 January 27 – Abraham Walkowitz, American painter working in the Modernist style (born 1878)
 January 30 – Bernard Fleetwood-Walker, English artist (born 1893)
 February 18 – Yevgeny Charushin, Russian graphic artists (born 1901)
 February 24 – Frank H. Mason, English marine and poster painter (born 1875)
 May 7 – Charles Sheeler, American modernist painter and photographer (born 1883)
 May 19 – Albin Polasek, Czech American sculptor (born 1879)
 May 20 – Charles Camoin, French Fauvist painter (born 1879)
 June 14 – Zoltán Kemény, Hungarian Swiss sculptor (born 1907)
 June 21 – Piotr Buchkin, Russian painter and graphic artist (born 1886)
 June 26 – G. David Thompson, American industrialist and collector of modern art (born 1899)
 August 27 – Le Corbusier, Swiss-born French architect and painter (born 1887)
 September 17 – Wilhelm Heise, German painter (born 1892)
 October 19 – Edward Willis Redfield, American landscape painter (born 1869)
 date unknown – George Barker, American painter (born 1882)

See also
 1965 in fine arts of the Soviet Union

References

 
Years of the 20th century in art
1960s in art

ru:1965 год в истории изобразительного искусства СССР